The 2018–19 season was Al-Ettifaq's 74th season in existence and their third consecutive season in the Pro League. Along with the Pro League, the club competed in the King Cup.

The season covers the period from 1 July 2018 to 30 June 2019.

Players

Squad information

Out on loan

Transfers

In

Summer

Winter

Loan in

Summer

Winter

Out

Summer

Winter

Loan out

Summer

Winter

Pre-season friendlies

Competitions

Overall

Last Updated: 16 May 2019

Pro League

League table

Results summary

Results by round

Matches
All times are local, AST (UTC+3).

King Cup
All times are local, AST (UTC+3).

Statistics

Appearances
Last updated on 16 May 2019.

|-
! colspan=14 style=background:#dcdcdc; text-align:center|Goalkeepers

|-
! colspan=14 style=background:#dcdcdc; text-align:center|Defenders

|-
! colspan=14 style=background:#dcdcdc; text-align:center|Midfielders

|-
! colspan=14 style=background:#dcdcdc; text-align:center|Forwards

|-
! colspan=14 style=background:#dcdcdc; text-align:center| Players sent out on loan this season

|-
! colspan=14 style=background:#dcdcdc; text-align:center| Player who made an appearance this season but have left the club

|}

Goalscorers

Last Updated: 6 April 2019

Assists

Last Updated: 28 March 2019

Clean sheets

Last Updated: 11 April 2019

References

Ettifaq FC seasons
Ettifaq